Myoxocephalus scorpius, typically known as the shorthorn sculpin or bull-rout, is a species of fish in the family Cottidae. It is a demersal species of the Northern Atlantic and adjacent subarctic and Arctic seas. The species has many English names that are used less frequently or in small parts of its range, including Arctic sculpin, daddy sculpin, European sculpin, father-lasher, goat sculpin, Greenland sculpin, guffy, horny whore, pig-fish, scully, scummy, short-spined sea scorpion and warty sculpin.

Appearance
The fish has a squat appearance, a large spiny head and a tapering body. It is a mottled grey-brown in colour but can be darker, including black as base colouring. It has a large mouth and spiny gill covers.

The shorthorn sculpin is not venomous, but it can be mistaken for similar looking venomous fishes, notably scorpionfish.

Habitat and behaviour
Although primarily a marine species, it also occurs in brackish waters like the Baltic Sea. Like some other coldwater fish, it has antifreeze proteins, which allow it to survive at temperatures around or slightly below freezing.

It was known that sculpin have been affected by heavy metal exposure in West Greenland by a former lead (Pb) - zinc (Zn) mine. Through analysing samples of three different sites, a positive correlation was found between fish at a closer distance to the mine and mucus secretion. This mucus creates a layer over the body that can cause respiratory stress, irregular swimming, and also affects their relationships with parasites. Researchers are hoping to use this mucosal mapping to help better understand effects of contaminant and parasite exposure for future studies.

They feed on a wide range of demersal and benthic fishes and crustaceans.

The shorthorn sculpin spawns in December through March, the eggs being laid on between rocks in a clump protected by the male. They usually hatch in five weeks.

References

External links
 
 

scorpius
Fish described in 1758
Taxa named by Carl Linnaeus